Wales competed at the 2022 Commonwealth Games in Birmingham, England, between 28 July and 8 August 2022. Having competed at every Games since their 1930 inauguration, it was Wales' twenty-second appearance.

Geraint Thomas and Tesni Evans served as the delegation's flagbearers during the opening ceremony. Rosie Eccles carried the flag at the closing ceremony.

Medal tables
Wales finished tenth in the medal table, with a total of 28 medals, including 8 golds.

Competitors
The following is the list of number of competitors participating at the Games per sport/discipline.

Note

Athletics

A squad of twenty-two athletes and para athletes was officially selected on 8 June 2022. The para athletes all qualified via the World Para Athletics World Rankings (for performances registered between 31 December 2020 and 25 April 2022).

Two more athletes have since been added to the squad.

Men
Track and road events

Field events

Women
Track and road events

Field events

Combined events – Heptathlon

Boxing

A squad of nine boxers was officially selected on 8 June 2022.

Men

Women

Cycling

A squad of twenty-four cyclists and para cyclists (plus three pilots) was officially selected on 8 June 2022. The para cyclists were awarded with quota places earned via the UCI Individual Tandem B Track Para Rankings (for performances registered between 1 January 2021 and 18 April 2022).

The selection of Elinor Barker was particularly notable as she will take part in the road race less than five months after giving birth.

Road
Men

Women

Track
Sprint

Keirin

Time trial

Pursuit

Points race

Scratch race

Diving

A squad of three divers was officially selected on 8 June 2022.

Gymnastics

A squad of thirteen gymnasts was officially selected on 15 June 2022.

Artistic
Men
Team Final & Individual Qualification

Individual Finals

Women
Team Final & Individual Qualification

Individual Finals

Rhythmic
Team Final & Individual Qualification

Individual Finals

Hockey

By virtue of its position in the FIH World Rankings for men and women respectively (as of 1 February 2022), Wales qualified for both tournaments.

Detailed fixtures were released on 9 March 2022, followed by both rosters on 15 June 2022.

Summary

Men's tournament

Roster

Toby Reynolds-Cotterill (gk)
Dewi Roblin (gk)
Gareth Furlong
Daniel Kyriakides
Hywel Jones
Ioan Wall
Steve Kelly
Lewis Prosser (co-c)
Jacob Draper
Dale Hutchinson
Rupert Shipperley (co-c)
Joe Naughalty
Gareth Griffiths
Rhys Bradshaw
Luke Hawker (co-c)
James Carson
Ben Francis
Owain Dolan-Gray

Group play

Fifth place match

Women's tournament

Roster

Beth Bingham (co-c)
Ella Jackson (gk)
Eloise Laity
Hannah Cozens
Holly Munro
Izzie Howell
Izzy Webb
Jo Westwood
Leah Wilkinson (co-c)
Livvy Hoskins
Millie Holme
Phoebe Richards
Rebecca Daniel
Rose Thomas (gk)
Sarah Jones
Sian French (co-c)
Sophie Robinson
Xenna Hughes

Group play

Seventh place match

Judo

A squad of six judoka was officially selected on 8 June 2022.

Men

Women

Lawn bowls

A squad of four parasport players (plus two directors) was officially selected on 27 May 2022.

Ten players were added to the squad on 8 June 2022.

Men

Women

Parasport

Netball

By virtue of its position in the World Netball Rankings (as of 31 January 2022), Wales qualified for the tournament.

Complete fixtures were announced in March 2022, followed by the chosen squad on 5 July 2022.

Summary

Roster

Betsy Creak
Georgia Rowe
Zoe Matthewman
Eleanor Roberts
Suzy Drane (co-c)
Bethan Dyke
Clare Jones (co-vc)
Shona O'Dwyer
Nia Jones (co-c)
Christina Shaw
Leila Thomas
Ella Powell-Davies (co-vc)

Group play

Seventh place match

Rugby sevens

Wales officially qualified for the men's tournament. They did so through their position in the 2018–19 / 2019–20 World Rugby Sevens Series.

The squad was confirmed on 13 July 2022.

Summary

Men's tournament

Roster
 
Luke Treharne
Tyler Morgan
Morgan Sieniawski
Sam Cross
Tom Brown
Callum Williams
Owen Jenkins
Tom Williams 
Morgan Williams
Cole Swannack
Lloyd Lewis
Ewan Rosser
Callum Carson

Pool C

Classification Quarterfinals

9th-12th Semifinals

Squash

A squad of five players was officially selected on 8 June 2022.

Singles

Doubles

Swimming

Wales selected four para swimmers (one man, three women) on 27 May 2022.

Sixteen swimmers were added to the squad on 8 June 2022, including Tokyo 2020 relay champions Calum Jarvis and Matt Richards.

Men

Women

Mixed

Table tennis

Wales qualified for the women's team event. In addition, Callum Evans was picked for the men's singles event. The women's team was announced on 11 May 2022.

In addition, two parasport players were selected on 27 May 2022.

Singles

Doubles

Team

Parasport

Triathlon

One paratriathlete was officially selected on 27 May 2022, having qualified via the World Triathlon Para Rankings of 28 March 2022. Five triathletes and a guide were added on 8 June 2022.

Individual

Mixed relay
 

Paratriathlon

Weightlifting

Courtesy of their positions on the IWF Commonwealth Ranking List (which was finalised on 9 March 2022), a squad of seven weightlifters (two men, five women) was officially selected on 19 April 2022.

Men

Women

Wrestling

Two wrestlers were officially selected on 8 June 2022.

References

External links
Commonwealth Games Wales Official site

Nations at the 2022 Commonwealth Games
Wales at the Commonwealth Games
2022 in Welsh sport